St. Thomas Municipal Airport  is a public use airport located one nautical mile (2 km) northeast of the central business district of St. Thomas, a city in Pembina County, North Dakota, United States. It is owned by the St. Thomas Airport Authority.

Facilities and aircraft 
St. Thomas Municipal Airport covers an area of 50 acres (20 ha) at an elevation of 837 feet (255 m) above mean sea level. It has one runway designated 17/35 with an asphalt surface measuring 2,600 by 50 feet (792 x 15 m).

For the 12-month period ending October 8, 2008, the airport had 1,716 aircraft operations, an average of 143 per month: 99% general aviation and 1% air taxi. At that time there were 10 single-engine aircraft based at this airport.

See also 
 List of airports in North Dakota

References

External links 
 St. Thomas Municipal (4S5) at North Dakota Aeronautics Commission airport directory
 Aerial image as of September 1997 from USGS The National Map
 

Airports in North Dakota
Buildings and structures in Pembina County, North Dakota
Transportation in Pembina County, North Dakota